Chenachène (also written Chenachane) is an isolated village in the commune of Tindouf, in Tindouf Province, Algeria.

Climate
Chenachène has a hyper-arid hot desert climate (Köppen BWh). It is one of the driest places on earth and the hottest during summer.

See also
 Furnace Creek
 Taghaza
 Taoudenni
 Tanezrouft

References

Neighbouring towns and cities

Populated places in Tindouf Province